Maurizio Pochettino Grippaldi (born 30 March 2001) is a Spanish professional footballer who plays as a winger for Primera Federación club Gimnàstic de Tarragona.

Early life
Pochettino is the son of the Argentine football manager and former footballer, Mauricio Pochettino. He was born in Barcelona when his father was playing for RCD Espanyol, and spent part of his childhood in France and England.

Career
Pochettino joined the academy of Southampton when his father was appointed their manager, and moved to Tottenham Hotspur in 2015.

Pochettino signed his first professional contract with Tottenham Hotspur in July 2019, joining up with their under-23 side. He signed a new contract with the club on 29 June 2020.

On 31 January 2021, Pochettino joined Watford on a free transfer. He made his professional debut in a 2–0 EFL Championship defeat to Brentford on 1 May, as an 85th-minute substitute for Dan Gosling.
	
Pochettino was released by Watford at the end of the 2021–22 season.

In July 2022, it was announced that Pochettino had signed for Primera Federación club Gimnàstic de Tarragona on a one-year deal.

Personal life
Born in Spain, Pochettino's parents are both Argentine-Italians.

References

External links
 
 Watford Profile

2001 births
Living people
Spanish people of Argentine descent
Spanish people of Italian descent
Footballers from Barcelona
Spanish footballers
Association football wingers
Tottenham Hotspur F.C. players
Watford F.C. players
Gimnàstic de Tarragona footballers
English Football League players
Spanish expatriate footballers
Spanish expatriate sportspeople in England
Expatriate footballers in England
Sportspeople of Italian descent